Hubbel Palmer is an American actor and screenwriter best known for his roles as Carl in the film Moving McAllister (2007) and as Tracy Orbison in the independent film American Fork ( "Humble Pie") (2007) which he wrote.

Filmography

References

External links

1977 births
American male film actors
Brigham Young University alumni
21st-century American male actors
American male screenwriters
Male actors from Salt Lake City
Living people
Writers from Salt Lake City
Screenwriters from Utah